Elysian Grove (Welsh: Llwyn Afallon) is a street in the  community and town of Aberystwyth, Ceredigion, Wales, which is  from Cardiff.

The area was built up in the 1930s.  Prior to this, Elysian Grove, also known as Panglais Dingle, referred to an area on the lower slopes of Panglais Hill.  It was well known as an entertainment venue, with an open air stage during the summer, mainly offering concerts and pierrot.  There was also a pay-for-entry playground and woodland walks run by the Penglais Estate.  Live outdoor entertainment began on the site in the late 1890s and continued until 1926.  A contract for a 1,000-seat pavilion was tendered in 1908. and built by 1910.  The remains of the stage, located slightly uphill of the start of Dan-Y-Coed, were still visible in the 1970s.

See also
List of localities in Wales by population

References

External links
Peter Davis Digitised Postcards Collection:Coflein, postcard depicting a woodland walk in Elysian Grove.

Villages in Ceredigion